Labidochromis ianthinus is a species of cichlid endemic to Lake Malawi where it is only known to occur around the Mbenji Islands.  This species can reach a length of  TL.  It can also be found in the aquarium trade.

References

ianthinus
Fish described in 1982
Fish of Lake Malawi
Cichlid fish of Africa
Taxonomy articles created by Polbot